Animal welfare in Thailand relates to the treatment of animals in fields such as agriculture, hunting, medical testing, tourism, and the domestic ownership of animals. It is distinct from animal conservation.

Laws 
Thailand introduced its first animal welfare law in 2014. The Cruelty Prevention and Welfare of Animal Act, B.E. 2557 (2014) came into being on 27 December 2014.

Animals protected by the law are defined as those "raised as pets, as animals for work, as beasts of burden, as friends, as livestock, as performing show animals, or for any other purpose, no matter with or without owners". Owners of animals are now required by law to "raise, nurture and keep the animals in appropriate conditions with good health and sanitation and with sufficient food and water". Within the act, the term "owner" is deemed to cover all family members, domestic help, and any friends assigned to take care of a pet.

Menus with live vertebrate are now illegal in Thailand. Trading in and consuming dog and cat meat is now illegal in Thailand under the 2014 Act. Feeding live prey to snakes, crocodiles or other animals is also prohibited.

It prohibits neglect, torture, and uncaring transport of live animals. Neglect includes improper housing and transportation of animals, which can lead to injury and death. An offense is punishable by law, which may impose a two year-term in prison, and a fine of up to 40,000 baht (US$1,663), or both.

Pet owners who dump unwanted dogs and cats at temples can now be charged with abandoning and endangering the animal. People are instead encouraged take injured or unwanted animals to animal welfare organisations and associations who will raise the funds required or contact the authorities to manage the problem.

The Thai cabinet, in October 2018, approved an amendment to the animal cruelty law. The amendment, initiated by the Department of Livestock Development of the Agriculture Ministry, would require the registration of pets. The majority of pet owners have accepted the need for registration in principle, but object to the proposed registration fee of 450 baht per animal.

Animal welfare issues

Abandoned animals
Thailand had about 350,000 stray dogs and cats in 2007. By 2017 the number had risen to 860,000. According to the Department of Livestock Development, "If we do nothing, Thailand will have as many as 2 million stray dogs and cats in 2027 and 5 million in 2037."

Animal fighting 
Killing animals according to religious ceremonies or beliefs and animal fighting according to local custom, such as cockfighting, is still permitted under the Prevention of Animal Cruelty and Provision of Animal Welfare Act.

Exploitation of elephants 

Working and performing elephants in Thailand are often poached from Myanmar and trafficked into Thailand. There are around 6,500 elephants currently living in Thailand, with around 2,500 of them being caught from the wild. Trafficked animals can be passed off as being locally reared, with birth and ownership documentation falsified.

Baby elephants are taken from the wild, with the adult elephants around the baby killed. The elephants are then often put through a process of beatings to "mentally break" them, to make them submissive for the lucrative entertainment of tourists in tourist parks.

Animal welfare advocates have called for better legislation and systems to document the origin of elephants in tourist camps and other locations across Thailand.

See also 
 Street dogs in Thailand
 :Category:Animal welfare organizations based in Thailand
 List of species native to Thailand

References